The International Commission on Mathematical Instruction (ICMI)  is a commission of the International Mathematical Union and is an internationally acting organization focussing on mathematics education. ICMI was founded in 1908 at the International Congress of Mathematicians (ICM) in Rome and aims to improve teaching standards around the world, through programs, workshops and initiatives and publications. It aims to work a great deal with developing countries, to increase teaching standards and education which can improve life quality and aid the country.

History

ICMI was founded at the ICM, and mathematician Felix Klein was elected first president of the organisation. Henri Fehr and Charles Laisant created the international research journal L'Enseignement Mathématique in 1899, and from early on this journal became the official organ of ICMI. A bulletin is published twice a year by ICMI, and from December 1995 this bulletin has been available at the organisation's official website, in their 'digital library'.

In the years between World War I and World War II there was little activity in the organization, but in 1952 ICMI was reconstituted. At this time the organization was reorganized, and it became an official commission of the International Mathematical Union (IMU). As a scientific organization, IMU is a member of the International Council for Science (ICSU). Although ICMI follows the general principles of IMU and ICSU, the organization has a large degree of autonomy.

Structure

All countries that are members of IMU are automatically members of ICMI; membership is also possible for non-IMU members. Currently, there are 90 member states of ICMI. Each member state has the right to appoint a national representative.

As a commission, ICMI has two main bodies:
 the Executive Committee (EC), and
 the national representatives from the member countries.

Together, these two constitute the General Assembly (GA) of ICMI. The GA is summoned every four years in connection with the International Congress on Mathematical Education, ICME. The executive committee is appointed by the general assembly of IMU for four-year terms.

Affiliate Organisations

These include multi-national organisations, which are independent from ICMI and have interests in the field of mathematics.

There are currently four multinational Mathematical Education Societies:

 CIAEM: Inter-American Committee on Mathematics Education (2009)
 CIEAEM: International Commission for the Study and Improvement of Mathematics Teaching (2010)
 ERME: European Society for Research in Mathematics Education (2010)
 MERGA: Mathematics Education Research Group of Australasia (2011)

And six international Study Groups which have obtained affiliation with ICMI:
 HPM: The International Study Group on the Relations between the History and Pedagogy of Mathematics (1976)
 ICTMA: The International Study Group for Mathematical Modelling and Applications (2003)
 IOWME: The International Organization of Women and Mathematics Education (1987)
 IGMCG: The International Group for Mathematical Creativity and Giftedness (2011)
 PME: The International Group for the Psychology of Mathematics Education (1976)
 WFNMC: The World Federation of National Mathematics Competitions (1994)

Conferences

International Congress on Mathematical Education

The International Congress on Mathematical Education (ICME) is an international event which is held every four years under the auspices of ICMI. The congress looks at the development of mathematical education across the world.

The last ICME was held in Hamburg in 2016 (link to website:http://icme13.org/). The next 2020 ICME will be held in Shanghai, China

ICMI Regional Conferences

ICMI sometimes offers financial as well as moral support to facilitate the organisation of regional meetings these have to be related to mathematical education. Precedence goes to less affluent countries. 
AFRICME: The Africa Regional Congress of ICMI on Mathematical Education was launched in 2005 and aims at offering a forum for mathematics educators throughout Africa.

CIAEM:  The Conferencia interamericana de educación matemática — Inter-American Conference on Mathematical Education organised by the Comité Interamericano de Educación Matemática - Inter-American Committee on Mathematical Education to promote discussion amongst Latin-American countries.

EARCOME:  is the name given to the ICMI-East Asia Regional Conferences in Mathematics Education. The South East Asia Conferences on Mathematics Education (SEACME) series began in 1978 in Manila. In addition there have been two ICMI-China Regional Conferences on Mathematics Education, in Beijing (1991) and Shanghai (1994). The EARCOME series has replaced the SEACME series.

EMF  Launched by the French Sub-Commission of ICMI on the occasion of the World Mathematical Year 2000, the series of Espace Mathématique Francophone conferences is built on a notion of "region" defined in linguistic rather than geographical terms, French being a common language among participants.
Other ICMI Regional Conferences occur on a more ad hoc basis. 
Approval of a Conference as an ICMI Regional Conference
Two main aspects are that:

•	The conference should be genuinely international, and not just a national activity;

•	The conference should aim for high standards of scientific quality, with a planning and organizing structure that assures this.

ICMI Publications and Research

There are a variety of various publications made by or under the auspices of ICMI, some resulting directly from activities organised by the Commission, examples include: 
•	The ICMI Bulletin
•	ICMI News – The ICMI electronic newsletter 
•	ICME Proceedings
•	ICMI Studies Publications
•	Proceedings from other ICMI Conferences
•	L’Enseignement Mathématique

ICMI Studies
Each ICMI Study addresses an issue or topic of particular significance in contemporary mathematics education, and is conducted by an international team of leading scholars and practitioners in that domain. The best contributing professionals from around the world are then invited to a carefully planned and structured international conference/workshop. Beyond the productive interaction and collaborations occasioned by this event, the main product is a Study volume, which are published in the New ICMI Study Series (NISS) by Springer Science+Business Media.

Awards

From 2000 onwards ICMI has been presenting the Felix Klein Award and the Hans Freudenthal Award. These prizes recognise outstanding achievement in mathematics education research. In 2013 the ICMI Emma Castelnuovo Award for Excellence in the Practice of Mathematics Education was created.

	The Felix Klein Award, named after the first president of the ICMI (1908-1920), honours a lifetime achievement: Guy Brousseau (2003),  Ubiratan D’Ambrosio (2005), Jeremy Kilpatrick (2007), Gilah Leder (2009), Michèle Artigue (2013).
	The Hans Freudenthal Award, named after the eighth president of ICMI (1967-1970), recognises a major cumulative programme of research: Celia Hoyles (2003), Paul Cobb (2005), Anna Sfard (2007), Yves Chevallard (2009), Luis Radford (2011), Frederick Leung (2013).
       The ICMI Emma Castelnuovo Award The award recognizes outstanding achievements in the practice of mathematics education. The award is named after Emma Castelnuovo, an Italian mathematics educator born in 1913 to celebrate her 100th birthday and honour her pioneering work. Awardees: Hugh Burkhardt and Malcolm Swan (2016).

ICMI Emma Castelnuovo/Award

In 2013 the ICMI Emma Castelnuovo Award for Excellence in the Practice of Mathematics Education was created. The award recognizes outstanding achievements in the practice of mathematics education. The award is named after Emma Castelnuovo, an Italian mathematics educator born in 1913 to celebrate her 100th birthday and honour her pioneering work.

The award honours persons, groups, projects, institutions or organizations engaged in the development and implementation of exceptional and influential work in the practice of mathematics education, including: classroom teaching, curriculum development, instructional design (of materials or pedagogical models), teacher preparation programs and/or field projects with a shown influence on schools, districts, regions or countries.

The award consists of a medal and a certificate accompanied by a citation and will be awarded only once every four years, delivered at the International Congress on Mathematical Education (ICME).

At each ICME, the medals and certificates of the awards are presented at the Opening Ceremony.  Furthermore, the awardees are invited to present special lectures at the Congress.

CANP

The Capacity & Networking Project is an international initiative to support mathematics education in the developing world and is a joint initiative of the international bodies of mathematicians (IMU) and mathematics educators (ICMI) in conjunction with UNESCO and International Congress of Industrial and Applied Mathematics, ICIAM. The project is a response to the report: Current Challenges in Basic Mathematics Education (UNESCO, 2011). CANP aims to enhance mathematics education at all levels in developing countries so that their people are capable of meeting the challenges these countries face. The first program was held in Bamako in Mali in September, 2011. The follow up meeting took place in Senegal in 2012. The second program was held in Costa Rica in 2012 and created a successful regional network.

Klein Project 
The Klein Project was launched in 2008 and aims to support mathematics teachers to connect the mathematics they teach, to the field of mathematics, while taking into account the evolution of this field over the last century. The Klein Project is inspired by Felix Klein’s famous book, Elementary Mathematics from an Advanced
Standpoint, published in 1908 and 1909. The project will have two main outputs: a book published in several languages and a blog which includes many materials for mathematics teachers to be used in the class room.

External links
 ICMI official website
 IMU
 ICSU
 NISS Book Series
ICMI and UNESCO 
 History of ICMI

Organizations established in 1908
International scientific organizations
Mathematics organizations
Mathematics education
1908 establishments in Italy